The Glass Bottom Boat is a 1966 American romantic spy comedy film directed by Frank Tashlin and starring Doris Day, Rod Taylor, and Arthur Godfrey, with John McGiver, Paul Lynde, Edward Andrews, Eric Fleming, Dom DeLuise, and Dick Martin. It is also known as The Spy in Lace Panties.

Plot
Axel Nordstrom manages a glass-bottom boat tourist operation in the waters of Santa Catalina Island, California. His widowed daughter, Jennifer Nelson, occasionally helps by donning a mermaid costume and swimming underneath his boat for the passengers' amusement.

One day, Jennifer accidentally meets Bruce Templeton when his fishing hook snags her costume. He reels in the bottom half, leaving the irate Jennifer floating in the water bottomless. She later has a run-in with Bruce at her new place of employment, an aerospace research company in Long Beach, where she works in public relations. After she discovers that Templeton is the president of the company, she embarrassedly apologizes to him, but he clearly has taken a liking to her.

Bruce's company has created a gravitation control device, called the GISMO, which the U.S. Air Force plans to put into orbit in a few weeks and whose secret formula is sought after by the Soviet Union. Bruce hires Jennifer for a new full-time assignment: to be his biographer and write his life story, while he is working on GISMO. His real purpose is to win her affections. Jennifer accompanies him to many of his appointments and begins to feel affection for him. When she is invited to his home, she meets Edgar Hill, a CIA agent making sure the GISMO project is securely handled, and Julius Pritter, a bumbling electronics technician who is installing a Hi-Fi system in Bruce's home. After Julius is left alone in a room, he is seen searching it for information regarding GISMO. He finds and photographs a cryptic note which Bruce had written while brainstorming ideas how to win Jennifer's affection. Julius is later seen transferring the photos to his handler.

When Bruce drives Jennifer with his remote-controlled high-speed boat to Catalina, the remote malfunctions and Bruce is thrown from the wildly careening boat, which eventually lands in a parking lot with Jennifer. After Bruce and Jennifer spend a happy evening with Axel and his wife, Jennifer's feelings for Bruce deepen.

Bruce is summoned to a meeting with Hill, bumbling security guard Homer Cripps and PR executive Zack Molloy. There Hill explains to him that secret information is leaking, e.g. the note that Julius had photographed. Cripps is very suspicious of Jennifer because of several odd things he had noticed about her: She dials the same telephone number several times every day, counts the rings and then hangs up with the words "that's enough for now, Vladimir." She burns papers alone late at night in the office. And she has a shortwave antenna installed in her home. There are innocent explanations for all of these things, which none of the people in the meeting know about: Vladimir is her dog, who gets his exercise by running through the house barking whenever he hears the phone ring. Jennifer had read a note in the office which explained that old documents should be burned so that they cannot be stolen. And she uses her shortwave antenna to communicate with Axel. Hill asks if the formula is safe and Bruce explains that the two copies are stored in voice activated safes, whose operation Bruce shows to the people in the meeting. Bruce begins to have some doubts regarding Jennifer, imagining her as Mata Hari, but shakes off his doubts. Later that evening, Air Force General Wallace Bleecker arrives to watch over the GISMO project.

Julius is confronted by his handler for only providing useless or publicly known information and is pressured into spying at a party which will be held by Bruce the next day. Cripps in turn is spying on Jennifer, overhearing her talking to her father and misunderstanding her end of the conversation as more proof of her involvement in espionage.

At the party, Bruce brings Jennifer to a guest room, where she declares her love for him and they plan to spend the night together, but Bruce is again called away to a meeting with Hill, Cripps, Molloy and Bleecker where they discuss the suspicions regarding Jennifer. When she picks up the phone to call Vladimir again, she is able to listen in on the discussion. She is furious at Cripps, Molloy and Bleecker for suspecting her of wrongdoing. And even though Bruce defends her and believes in her innocence, his remark that she is not intelligent enough for this kind of operation infuriates her even more. She intends to turn the tables by pretending to be a spy. She arranges for Molloy and Bleecker to have an embarrassing tete-a-tete by promising to meet both at the same time in the guest room. She manages to tie up Cripps, who had tailed her wearing women's clothing, in the powder room. When Bruce notices her deeds, he is angry and locks her up in the closet. There, she is freed by a hidden Hill, who is revealed to be a spy, has stolen the GISMO formula, and put it in Jennifer's purse to smuggle it out of the house.

When Jennifer returns home, she is confronted by Julius. But it is soon revealed that he is only carrying a water pistol and is harmless. But then Hill arrives, draws a gun, reveals himself as the spy and requests the formula. Julius and Jennifer manage to fight him off and then Jennifer flees through the neighborhood while Bruce, Cripps, Bleecker and Molloy, who have found out the truth, race in their cars to save Jennifer. Hill is finally stopped by a blow to the head with a nightlamp by neighbor Mabel Fenimore.

The film ends with Jennifer and Bruce on their honeymoon, where they ride the same boat from before, which again malfunctions and leaves them in the parking lot on Catalina Island.

Cast

Pearce and Tobias play an inquisitive wife and her disinterested husband, in roles not unlike the ones they played at the time in the television series Bewitched. The film was also released three months after Pearce's death.

Robert Vaughn, famous at the time for playing Napoleon Solo in the TV series The Man from U.N.C.L.E., makes a very brief non-speaking appearance as a sight gag; the theme from his TV series is heard when he is seen onscreen.

Production
Shooting partly took place on Catalina Island from September 13 to 19, 1965. It was Rod Taylor's second film with Doris Day following Do Not Disturb.

The Nautilus boat used in the film sank in the Catalina harbor in 2008. It is currently drydocked in a private part of the island.

The mermaid costume worn by Doris Day in the opening scene is now on display at the Catalina Casino and can be viewed on the Casino tour.

The film stands apart from Day's other 1960s comedies due to animator-turned-director Tashlin's signature penchant for elaborate, cartoon-like gags and humor. This includes Taylor's futuristic, robotic kitchen; a chase scene involving a runaway remote-controlled speedboat; Day accidentally falling into a zero-gravity tank, and a slapstick sequence involving DeLuise as an inept electrician, which closely resembles Tashlin's frequent collaborations with Jerry Lewis.

Music
The film's score was composed by Frank DeVol and includes selections from Beethoven's "Symphony No. 5 in C minor", Mendelssohn's "Wedding March in C major", "Aloha 'Oe" (written by Queen Liliuokalani) and Goldsmith's "Theme from The Man from U.N.C.L.E."

Day sings a shortened version of "Soft as the Starlight" (written by Joe Lubin and Jerome Howard), which she previously sang in its entirety on the 1957 album Day by Night. The song "The Glass Bottom Boat" is a rearrangement of "Soft as the Starlight" with completely different lyrics and is heard twice in the film: over the opening credits, sung by Day, and again as source music sung by Day, Taylor, Godfrey and Fraser. Day also sings a single verse from her signature song, "Whatever Will Be, Will Be (Que Sera, Sera)" (written by Jay Livingston and Ray Evans). Dick Martin sings a brief a cappella rendition of  "Be My Love" (written by Sammy Cahn and Nicholas Brodszky).

Reception
The film was an attempt to appeal both to Day's traditional fans and to a younger audience. It was a success financially, earning $4,320,000 in North American rentals by the end of 1966.

It drew 21,752 admissions in France.

On Rotten Tomatoes, the film holds a critical approval of 50%, based on 6 reviews, with an average rating of 5.6/10.

Day followed up with Caprice (1967), a comedy-thriller more completely in the spy spoof genre, again with Tashlin directing, but it was a critical and commercial failure.

Home media
The DVD of The Glass Bottom Boat (released in 2005) includes three vintage featurettes (Catalina Island, Every Girl's Dream, and NASA), as well as the Oscar-Winning cartoon The Dot and the Line.

See also
 List of American films of 1966
 The Pritzker Estate

References

Bibliography

External links
 
 
 
 
  
 Boat used in film sinks off coast of California (2006)

1966 films
1966 romantic comedy films
1960s English-language films
1960s spy comedy films
American romantic comedy films
American spy comedy films
Films scored by Frank De Vol
Films directed by Frank Tashlin
Films set in Los Angeles County, California
Films set on boats
Metro-Goldwyn-Mayer films
Santa Catalina Island (California)
Seafaring films
1960s American films